Derek Woodall is a former professional rugby league footballer who played in the 1970s and 1980s. He played at club level for Castleford (Heritage № 548).

Background
Derek Woodall was a pupil at Airedale Junior School.

Playing career

County Cup Final appearances
Derek Woodall played as an interchange/substitute, i.e. number 15, (replacing  Tony Fisher) in Castleford's 17-7 victory over Featherstone Rovers in the 1977 Yorkshire County Cup Final during the 1977–78 season at Headingley Rugby Stadium, Leeds on Saturday 15 October 1977.

References

External links
Search for "Woodall" at rugbyleagueproject.org
Derek Woodall Memory Box Search at archive.castigersheritage.com

Living people
Castleford Tigers players
English rugby league players
Place of birth missing (living people)
Rugby league props
Year of birth missing (living people)